USS Darter has been the name of more than one United States Navy ship, and may refer to:

 , a submarine commissioned in 1943 and wrecked in 1944
 ,  a submarine in commission from 1956 to 1989

United States Navy ship names